The year 1618 in music involved some significant events.

Events 
May 23 – Beginning of the Thirty Years' War (1618–1648), which will disrupt German musical establishments, and will affect the nature of the music composed by those who endured the widespread devastation, famine, and disease of this period.
 The first Zildjian cymbals are made.
Robert Ballard becomes lutenist and composer at the court of King Louis XIII of France.
Michael East is choirmaster at Lichfield Cathedral.

Publications 
Sebastián Aguilera de Heredia – Magnificats for four, five, six, and eight voices (Zaragoza: Petrus Cabarte)
Gregorio Allegri – Concerti, vol. 1
Francesca Caccini – First book of music for one and two voices (Florence: Zanobi Pignoni)
Johannes Vodnianus Campanus –  (Two books of sacred odes) for four voices (Prague: Johann Schönfeld), book one contains psalms while book two contains hymns
Christoph Demantius
 for eight voices (Freiberg: Georg Hoffmann), an epithalamium for the wedding of Heinrich Schönleben and Magdalena Tannenberg on October 20
 for eight voices (Freiberg: Georg Hoffmann), an epithalamium for the wedding of Johannes Reger and Susanna Reisiger on November 3
  for eight voices (Freiberg: Georg Hoffmann), an epithalamium for the wedding of Georg Schöller and Maria Caspar Dachsell
 for six voices (Freiberg: Georg Hoffmann), written for the funeral of Michael Rothen
Richard Dering –  for six voices with basso continuo (Antwerp: Pierre Phalèse)
René Descartes – 
Ignazio Donati
 for two, three, four, and five voices (Venice: Giacomo Vincenti)
 for one, two, three, four, and five voices, Op. 5 (Venice: Giacomo Vincenti)
 for five and six voices, Op. 6 (Venice: Giacomo Vincenti)
Michael East – The Fourth Set Of Bookes ... to 4. 5. and 6. Parts: Apt for Viols and Voyces
Melchior Franck
 for five voices (Coburg: Justus Hauck), a wedding motet
 for five voices (Coburg: Justus Hauck), a wedding motet
Psalm 122 for eight voices in two choirs (Coburg: Justus Hauck)
 for eight voices in two choirs (Coburg: Kaspar Bertsch)
Giovanni Bernardino Nanino – Fourth book of motets for one, two, three, four, and five voices with organ bass (Rome: Giovanni Battista Robletti)
Pomponio Nenna – Eighth book of madrigals for five voices (Rome: Giovanni Battista Robletti)
Pietro Pace – The sixth book of motets..., Op. 16 (Venice: Giacomo Vincenti)
Francesco Pasquali
Cantiones..., Op. 3 (Rome: Giovanni Battista Robletti)
Second book of madrigals, Op. 4 (Venice: Giacomo Vincenti)
Isaac Posch –  for four voices (Regensburg: Matthias Mylius for Isaac Posch), a collection of dance music
Hieronymus Praetorius –  for five, six, seven, eight, ten, twelve, fourteen, and twenty voices, Op. 4 (Hamburg: Heinrich Carstens)
Michael Praetorius – De Organographia
Johann Hermann Schein – Opella nova (Little new works), volume 1, a collection of sacred concertos

Classical music

Opera 
Claudio Monteverdi – Andromeda (lost)

Births 
date unknown
Solomon Eccles, composer (died 1683)
Pierre Robert, composer (died 1699)

Deaths 
December 10 – Giulio Caccini, Italian composer (born 1551)
December 12 – Pedro de Cristo, composer (born c.1550)

References

 
Music
17th century in music
Music by year